Hold My Hand is a 2013 South Korean morning soap opera starring Park Si-eun, Bae Geu-rin, Lee Jae-hwang, and Jin Tae-hyun. It premiered on October 7, 2013 on MBC, airing every Monday to Friday at 7:50 a.m. for 130 episodes.

Synopsis
Yeon-soo has a bright and positive personality. Since her father died, she lives with her mother and younger brother. Despite their financially difficult situation, Yeon-soo lives happily with her family and her boyfriend Jung-hyun.

But then Yeon-soo's life changes drastically. Her mother is killed and Yeon-soo is accused of murdering her. Every piece of evidence points to her as her mother's killer.

Cast
Park Si-eun as Han Yeon-soo
Bae Geu-rin as Oh Shin-hee
Lee Jae-hwang as Min Joo-won
Jin Tae-hyun as Min Jung-hyun
Ahn Mi-na as Park Mi-jin
Geum Bo-ra as Kang Yang-soon
Kim Young-ran as Kang Ae-soon
Park Jung-soo as Na Geum-ja
Choi Sang-hoon as Min Dong-hoon
Ahn Suk-hwan as Oh Jin-tae
Lee Chang-wook as Jung Hyun-soo
Kim Dong-gyun as Kim Chul-jin

International broadcast
 It aired in Vietnam from May 26, 2015 on VTV3.

See also
List of South Korean dramas

References

External links
Hold My Hand official MBC website 
Hold My Hand at MBC Global Media

MBC TV television dramas
2013 South Korean television series debuts
2014 South Korean television series endings
Korean-language television shows
South Korean romance television series
Television series by MBC C&I